Kurosawaia is a genus of beetles in the family Buprestidae, containing the following species:

 Kurosawaia iridinota Bellamy, 1990
 Kurosawaia yanoi (Kurosawa, 1963)

References

Buprestidae genera